Elizabeth Pickett may refer to:

Elizabeth Pickett Chevalier (1896–1984), American author, screenwriter, and silent short-film director